Signature Aviation is a multinational aviation services company headquartered in Orlando, Florida.

The company has been known by numerous names over the years, having been founded as W. Wilson Cobbett Ltd in 1879; it was renamed to Scandinavia Belting during 1911, British Belting & Asbestos in 1925, and BBA Group during 1967. It has been a long term specialist in the manufacture of industrial supplies, particularly in the automotive and aviation sectors. During the Second World War, the company produced materials for British military aircraft, such as the Supermarine Spitfire, Hawker Hurricane, and Hawker Typhoon. By the early 1980s, BBA Group was the world's largest supplier of brake pads within the automotive industry, supplying multiple vehicle manufacturers with its products.

During the 1980s and 1990s, the firm decided to increasingly orientate itself towards the aviation industry via a string of acquisitions and divestitures, starting with the purchase of British aircraft undercarriage specialist APPH in 1986. By 1998, the firm's wholly-owned subsidiary, Signature Flight Support, had expanded to possess the world's largest chain of fixed base operators (FBOs). In 2007, the company adopted the name BBA Aviation to indicate its identity as an aviation specialist. During late 2019, following the sale of its Ontic division to CVC Capital Partners in exchange for $1.365 billion; the company rebranded itself as Signature Aviation.

It was listed on the London Stock Exchange until it was acquired by Cascade Investment, Blackstone Group, and private equity firm Global Infrastructure Partners in May 2021.

History

Early years
Signature Aviation can trace its origins back to W. Wilson Cobbett Ltd, an industrial belting works originally based in Scotland. Its early name came from its two founders, Sir William Fenton and Walter Cobbett, who established the company during 1879 to manufacture textile belts for use on industrial machinery. For its first thirty years, the production and sale of these belts comprised the company's main commercial activity; over time, Wilson Cobbett expanded into numerous specialist industrial niches and developed a global presence.

During 1911, as an indication of its international expansion, the company was renamed Scandinavia Belting; it continued to be rebranded throughout the twentieth century, becoming British Belting & Asbestos in 1925. During the interwar period, it manufactured numerous products for the automotive industry; the company was a supplier of the Ford Motor Company on its Model T vehicle as well as to other manufacturers, including Jaguar Cars. British Belting & Asbestos was also active in the aviation sector. During the Second World War, the company produced materials used on several British military aircraft, including the Supermarine Spitfire, Hawker Hurricane, and Hawker Typhoon. During 1967, the company opted to rebrand itself under the name BBA Group. During this period, it was largely focused upon the production of automotive materials. By the early 1980s, BBA Group was the world's largest supplier of brake pads within the automotive industry.

In 1986, BBA Group made its first major approach into the aviation sector via its acquisition of APPH, a British business that specialised in aircraft undercarriages and hydraulics; shortly thereafter, it also bought a similar business based in North America. During 1992, the company was involved in the creation of Signature Flight Support through the merger of Page Avjet, an executive aircraft interiors business, and Butler fixed base operations. In 1996, BBA Group took full ownership of Signature Flight Support. By this point, the company was structured into two major divisions: Aviation, and Materials Technologies.

During 1996, BBA Group purchased Trinity Aerospace Engineering; in 1998, the company moved into jet engine repair and overhaul through the acquisitions of H+S Aviation from Vector Industries, and UNC Airwork Corp, formerly a unit of American conglomerate General Electric. By 1998, Signature Flight Support had expanded to possess the world's largest chain of fixed base operators (FBOs), operating a total of 41 facilities across the globe.

Twenty-first century 
During 2000, BBA Group conducted a major divestment, selling off its Mintex brake pad division in exchange for £389m. Around this time, the company also diversified into the flight training sector, purchasing Oxford Aviation, then the largest professional pilot training organisation in Europe, for £55.4 million. During the following year, BBA Group bought American business Aircraft Service International Group ('ASIG'), the acquisition of which reportedly doubled the firm's presence in the commercial ground handling market, for $25m. During 2002, the group's chief executive Roy McGlone stated that management's strategy at that point was to focus on its FBO ventures and to dispose of non-core businesses. As a sign of the company's changes, BBA Group was reclassified upon the London Stock Exchange from the engineering sector to the transport sector.

During 2006, BBA Group opted to demerge its materials technology division, which developed and manufactured nonwoven materials used in the hygiene and medical markets and in numerous industrial applications, and friction materials for train brakes: the demerged business was named Fiberweb plc. That same year, Ontic, a legacy aerospace components supplier, was acquired; Oxford Aviation was sold on during the following year. BBA Group's name was changed to BBA Aviation in 2007 to mark its transformation to a focused aviation group.

In 2008, BBA Aviation bought the assets of Hawker Beechcraft Services Inc's Line Service Operations in exchange for £65.4 million. During 2011, it bought GE Aviation's fuel measurement business for £38.3m and a new services base at Bozeman in Montana, United States for $10.5m. In 2012, BBA Aviation purchased Dryden Air Services and PLH Aviation in Canada, securing a presence in the Canadian market for the business. During 2013, it acquired Maguire Aviation Group for $69 million. That same year, BBA Aviation reportedly withdrew from talks with Dubai Aerospace Enterprise over acquiring aircraft maintenance provider StandardAero. In 2014, BBA Aviation sold APPH (comprising UK sites and US Wichita site) for $128 million to Héroux-Devtek Inc.

In 2015, BBA Aviation significantly increased the reach of the Signature Flight Support network through the acquisition of Landmark Aviation from The Carlyle Group for $2.1 billion; aviation periodical Flight International described the deal as being "the largest acquisition in the history of the business aviation services industry". During 2017, its ASIG subsidiary was sold off for $202 million. Early that same year, BBA Aviation and Gama Aviation agreed to merge their charter and management operations together, reportedly forming the largest aircraft management business in the United States as a result. In 2018, BBA Aviation acquired fuel specialist EPIC Aviation; that same year, it also bought Firstmark Corp, a provider of proprietary components and subsystems, which was incorporated into the Ontic portfolio.

During late 2019, BBA Group decided to sell Ontic onto CVC Capital Partners in exchange for $1.365 billion; the firm also announced a special dividend to shareholders totalling $835 million from the proceeds of the sale. To reflect its change in business focus, the company's board also elected to rename the group Signature Aviation to better align the firm with its most significant brand in its core market.

In February 2021, Bill Gates owned Cascade Investment, Blackstone Group, and private equity firm Global Infrastructure Partners made a $4.7 billion offer to acquire Signature Aviation. As a result of the acquisition Cascade's stake increased from 19% to 30%.

In August 2022, the company acquired the TAC Air division of The Arnold Companies. It was announced that fourteen TAC Air locations would be rebranded as Signature Aviation as part of the deal.

Operations
The company is headquartered in London and has significant operations in the US as well as Europe, Asia, South America and Africa.

References

External links
Signature Aviation Corporate Website

Aircraft component manufacturers of the United Kingdom
Business services companies of the United Kingdom
Business services companies established in 1879
Manufacturing companies established in 1879
Companies based in Luton
Companies formerly listed on the London Stock Exchange
1879 establishments in England